The lycée polyvalent de Turgot is a lycée located in the 3rd arrondissement of Paris. Its entrance is located at 69 rue de Turbigo. It runs classe préparatoire aux grandes écoles in the D1, D2, PC and ECT streams.

The lycée was built on the former site of the Madelonnettes Convent, which was demolished by the construction of the rue de Turbigo, between 1865 and 1866. It is served by the métro stations Arts et Métiers and Temple.

History 

It was formerly known as the "Higher Primary School of rue Turbigo".

Ranking of the lycée 

In 2016, the lycée was ranked 13th out of 109 at departmental level in terms of teaching quality, and 43rd at national level. The ranking is based on three criteria: The bac results, the proportion of students who obtain their baccalauréat who studied at the establishment for their last two years, and the value added (calculated based on the social background of the students, their age, and their national diploma results).

CPGE rankings 

The national rankings of preparatory classes for the major schools (CPGE) look at the number of students admitted to the grandes écoles.

In 2015, L'Étudiant gave the following rankings for 2014 :

Former students
 Claude Bartolone (1951-), politician.
 Robert Desnos (1900-1945), French poet. 
 Paul Dukas (1865-1935), French composer.
 Honoré Champion (1846-1913), French editor.
 Yves Gomy (1942-), French entomologist (coleopterist).
 Richard Khaitzine (1947-), French writer. 
 Henri Lagriffoul (1907-1981), French sculptor laureate and grand Prix de Rome 1932 and sculptor of the reverse of the 1962 Franc centimes.
 André Malraux (1901-1976), French writer, adventurer and politician.
 Claude Miller (1942-2012), French cineast.
 Alain Minc (1949-), French essayist, economist and politician.
 Robi Morder (1954-), employment lawyer and policy maker, specialist in student movements. 
 André-Louis Perinetti (1933-), French theatre director.
 Jean-Jacques Romero (1945-) trade unionist.
 Jean Sarkozy (1986-), French politician.
 Pierre Rondeau (1987-), French economist.

Notable professors 
 Emmanuel Beau de Loménie, historian.
 Pierre Boutang (1916-1998), French philosopher, political journalist and translator 
 Pierre Goubert (1915-2012), historian
 Marc Bousseyrol, economist, writer, normalian.

Notes and references

Turgot
Turgot
3rd arrondissement of Paris